Threni may refer to:
 Latinized form of Greek Threnus ('lament'), an alternate name for the Book of Lamentations
 Threni (Stravinsky), Igor Stravinsky's 1958 musical setting of excerpts from the above